Dyson Williams DSO MC, later Dyson Brock Williams (13 October 1877 — 18 April 1922) was a Welsh cricketer. He was a right-handed batsman who played first-class cricket for Glamorgan during the 1921 season.

Williams was educated at Malvern School, and played cricket during the school holidays for Swansea cricket club. Thanks to his many connections, and in spite of running a solicitors' practice alongside his cricketing career, he still managed to play occasionally until 1914, at which point the Welshman went off to serve with the Welsh Regiment in the First World War. Following his experiences during the war, which left him mentally and physically scarred, taking up gambling and losing a vast amount of his accrued money in the process.

He played his first and only County Championship game during the 1921 season, against Hampshire, later becoming friends with Georges Carpentier and going to work in London for a boxing promoter. However, he kept losing money and was found dead in April 1922 in his London office.

Williams' brother Morgan played one match for Gentlemen of Glamorgan during the 1913 season.

External links
Dyson Williams at Cricket Archive 

1877 births
1922 deaths
Glamorgan cricketers
People educated at Malvern College
Welsh cricketers